Chryseofusus alisonae is a species of sea snail, a marine gastropod mollusk in the family Fasciolariidae, the spindle snails, the tulip snails and their allies.

Description

Distribution

References

 Hadorn R., Snyder M.A. & Fraussen K. 2008. A new Chryseofusus (Gastropoda: Fasciolariidae: Fusinus) from South and Western Australia. Novapex 9(2–3): 95–99

External links

alisonae
Gastropods described in 2008